Scaeurgus is a genus of octopuses in the family Octopodidae. The species of this genus are characterized by inhabiting the upper bathyal benthic zone from temperate and tropical latitudes in all major oceans.

Species
 Scaeurgus jumeau Norman, Hochberg & Boucher-Rodoni, 2005
 Scaeurgus nesis Norman, Hochberg & Boucher-Rodoni, 2005
 Scaeurgus patagiatus Berry, 1913
 Scaeurgus tuber Norman, Hochberg & Boucher-Rodoni, 2005
 Scaeurgus unicirrhus (Delle Chiaje, 1839-41 in Férussac and D'Orbigny, 1834-1848) - Atlantic Warty Octopus or Unihorn Octopus

References

External links

 

Octopodidae
Cephalopod genera